Toyo Seat Co., Ltd. is an automotive company based in Japan, founded in May 1947.  In January 1988, the company expanded to the United States as Toyo Seat USA Corp.  Further sites had been established in China (1992), Philippines (1998) and Hungary (2002).

Beside soft tops for convertibles and roofmodules, Toyo Seat produces automobile seats, mechanical products, automotive exhaust pipes, door trims, train seats, steel office furniture, health equipment, and other products.

At the end of 2006 Toyo Seat had about 900 employees and a turnover of US$43.2 billion.

Current production of roofmodules
Toyo Seat currently is producing roofmodules for the Mazda MX5 Mark 3 (2005), Honda S2000 Roadster, Nissan Fairlady Z (known in Europe as Nissan 350Z Roadster), Toyota Camry, Toyota MR-S and Toyota Solara.

External links
https://web.archive.org/web/20070430225155/http://toyoseat.co.jp/2english/1annai/1aisatu/en1100.htm
https://web.archive.org/web/20070927173123/http://www.toyoseat.co.jp/2english/2seihin/2convertible%20top/en2200.htm - Production

Convertible top suppliers
Automotive accessories
Automotive companies of Japan